Avis is both a given name, mostly feminine but also masculine, and a surname.

Given name
The earliest form of this female given name was the Old German Haduwig comprising the elements hadu "battle" and wig "fight": the original form of the modern German female name Hedwig, Haduwig was modified to Havoise by the Normans and subsequent to the Norman Invasion the name occurred frequently in England throughout the Middle Ages, the standard Middle English form of the name being Hawise. As a female given name in modern times, Avis is associated with the Latin avis, meaning "bird", although the spelling Avice is sometimes found.

People with the given name include:
Avis Acres (1910–1994), New Zealand children's author and illustrator
Avis Bohlen (born 1940), American diplomat, former Ambassador to Bulgaria
Avis Bunnage (1923–1990), British actress
Avis DeVoto (1904–1989), American editor and collaborator with Julia Child
Avis M. Dry (1922–2007), clinical psychologist and author on the psychology of Carl Jung
Avis Favaro (born 1958), Canadian TV medical correspondent
Avis Gray (born 1954), Canadian politician
Avis Higgs (1918–2016),  New Zealand textile designer and painter
Avis Hotchkiss, American pioneering motorcyclist who made a round-trip journey from New York to San Francisco with her daughter in 1915
Avis Kimble (born 1944), American model
Avice Landone (1910–1976), British actress
Avis McIntosh (born 1938), New Zealand former sprinter
Avis Miller (born 1945), American model and Playboy Playmate
Avis Newman (born 1946), English painter and sculptor
Avis Tucker (1915–2010), American owner and publisher of The Daily Star-Journal newspaper
Avis Stearns Van Wagenen (1841–1907), a partner in E. C. Stearns & Company
Avis Wyatt (born 1984), American male former basketball player

Surname
David Avis (born 1951), Canadian and British computer scientist
Gary Avis, English ballet dancer with The Royal Ballet
Paul Avis (born 1947), Anglican priest, theologian and ecumenist
Samuel B. Avis (1872–1924), American politician
Warren Avis (1915–2007), the founder of Avis Rent A Car

References

English feminine given names
Given names derived from birds